New Heavenly Sword and Dragon Sabre is a Hong Kong television series first broadcast on TVB Jade in 1986. A total of 40 episodes were produced.

Episodes

Episodes 01-20

Episodes 21-40

References

External links
 

Lists of Chinese drama television series episodes
Television episodes set in China